Wheeler is an unincorporated community in Cheyenne County, Kansas, United States.

History
A post office was opened in Wheeler in 1888, and remained in operation until it was discontinued in 1988.

References

Further reading

External links
 Cheyenne County Maps: Current, Historic, KDOT

Unincorporated communities in Cheyenne County, Kansas
Unincorporated communities in Kansas